Gabriela Konstancja Kulka-Stajewska (known as Gaba Kulka, born 1979 in Warsaw, Poland) is an independent artist, a songwriter, and performer.

Biography 
Gabriela Kulka was born to a family of musicians, her father, Konstanty Andrzej Kulka, is a well known Polish violinist and a professor at Chopin Music Academy in Warsaw. Following in her father's footsteps, she endured eight years of classical schooling in violin, but still ended up embracing the piano as a weapon of choice in her songwriting and performing activities.

She recorded her first full-length album, Between Miss Scylla and a Hard Place, in 2003, available in CD-R format. The year 2006 saw the release of her second LP, Out, a full-colour, professionally pressed affair. Both albums were completely independent releases. Aside from these, Gaba contributed to a (private?) compilation of covers called Songs for Wolf, containing covers of the likes of Björk, Ozzy Osbourne, Neil Diamond, Stevie Nicks and The Church).

In 2009 her third album, Hat, Rabbit, was released by major label Mystic Production and therefore Gaba Kulka gained wider popularity. The album went gold in Poland and with her singles "Niejasności", "Kara Niny" or "Got a Song" the singer became successful in more alternative-oriented radio stations. In the same year she issued her next album, Sleepwalk, a collaboration with Polish singer Konrad Kucz.

Musical style 
Over seven years of writing and recording, Gabriela Kulka developed the singular style of dark musical theatre mixed with a jazzy attitude, and a focus on poetic and quirky lyrics - influenced by Danny Elfman and Kate Bush on equal part. Her output is strongly influenced by classical music, jazz and pop.

Artists she names as her closest inspirations are, firstly and undeniably - Kate Bush and Tori Amos, but also Peter Gabriel, Kurt Weill, Danny Elfman, The Mystic Knights of the Oingo Boingo, Chroma Key, Queen, ABBA, Bruce Dickinson, and Iron Maiden (whose songs she performs live) and Madonna.

Discography

Solo albums

Collaborative albums

Video albums

Music videos

References

External links 
 Gaba Kulka official site

1979 births
Living people
Musicians from Warsaw
Mystic Production artists
Polish jazz singers
Polish pop singers
English-language singers from Poland
21st-century Polish singers
21st-century Polish women singers